"Could It Be Any Harder" is the third single from American rock band the Calling's debut album, Camino Palmero. Released in August 2002, it peaked at number number 35 on the US Billboard Adult Top 40 Tracks chart that September.

Charts

References

2001 songs
2002 singles
The Calling songs
RCA Records singles
Songs written by Aaron Kamin
Songs written by Alex Band